Route 30 is a  north-south provincial highway in Newfoundland and Labrador, extending from St. John's through Logy Bay-Middle Cove-Outer Cove to Torbay, all along the Avalon Peninsula of Newfoundland.

Route description

The highway's southern terminus is in St. John's, where it and Route 20 (Torbay Road) both branch off from Kenna's Hill north of the downtown core. Under the street name Logy Bay Road, the highway heads northeasterly for approximately 6.2 kilometres to the community of Logy Bay, where the highway transfers onto Lower Road and continues for two kilometres to Outer Cove. At Outer Cove it turns westerly as Marine Drive, continuing for 1.8 kilometres until Marine Drive meets Middle Cove Road near Middle Cove; it then follows Middle Cove Road for 1.9 kilometres until its northern terminus at Torbay Road, approximately half a kilometre north of Route 20's diversion from Torbay Road onto the Torbay Bypass.

Major intersections

See also
List of Newfoundland and Labrador highways
List of highways numbered 30

References

30